This is a list of butterflies of Tuvalu.

Lycaenidae

Polyommatinae
Zizina labradus mangoensis  (Butler, 1884)

Nymphalidae

Danainae
Danaus plexippus plexippus  (Linnaeus, 1758) 
Euploea lewinii distincta  (Butler, 1874)

Nymphalinae
Hypolimnas bolina rarik  von Eschscholtz, 1821
Junonia villida villida  (Fabricius, 1787)

See also

References

 W.John Tennent: A checklist of the butterflies of Melanesia, Micronesia, Polynesia and some adjacent areas. Zootaxa 1178: 1-209 (21 Apr. 2006)]
 William Rainbow described the butterflies, spiders and insects collected at Funafuti by Charles Hedley:  The insect fauna of Funafuti (Australian Museum, Sydney, 1897).

Butter
Tuvalu
Tuvalu
Tuvalu
Butterflies